The 1962–63 Southern Football League season was the 60th in the history of the league, an English football competition.

Cambridge City won the championship, whilst Hastings United, Hinckley Athletic, Margate and Nuneaton Borough were all promoted to the Premier Division. Seven Southern League clubs applied to join the Football League at the end of the season, but none were successful.

Premier Division
After Oxford United were elected to the Football League at the end за the previous season, the Premier Division consisted of 21 clubs, including 17 clubs from the previous season and four new clubs, promoted from Division One:
Dartford
Poole Town
Rugby Town
Wisbech Town

At the end of the season, Bexleyheath & Welling changed name to Bexley United.

League table

Division One
Division One consisted of 20 clubs, including 16 clubs from the previous season and four new clubs, relegated from the Premier Division:
Cheltenham Town
Folkestone Town
King's Lynn
Tonbridge

At the end of the season, Tunbridge Wells United changed name to Tunbridge Wells Rangers.

League table

Football League elections
Alongside the four League clubs facing re-election, a total of 12 non-League clubs applied for election, including seven Southern League clubs. All four League clubs were re-elected.

References
RSSF – Southern Football League archive

Southern Football League seasons
S